Tami Lee Oldham Ashcraft is an American sailor and author who, in 1983, survived 41 days adrift in the Pacific Ocean. Her story inspired the 2018 film Adrift.

1983 shipwreck

In 1983, Ashcraft's fiancé, 34-year-old British sailor Richard Sharp, was hired to deliver the  yacht Hazaña from Tahiti to San Diego. The then 23-year-old Ashcraft accompanied him on the crossing. The couple set sail from Papeete Harbor on September 22.

On October 12, the vessel was caught in the path of Hurricane Raymond. As the ship was being hit by  waves and  winds, Sharp sent Ashcraft below deck. Moments later, she heard him scream "Oh my God!" The yacht capsized and Ashcraft was thrown against the cabin wall and knocked unconscious. When she regained consciousness about 27 hours later, Sharp was gone and the Hazaña was severely damaged: the cabin was half-flooded, the masts had broken off the yacht, and the radio and navigation system were inoperable.

Ashcraft rigged a makeshift sail from a broken spinnaker pole and a storm jib (a triangular sail) and fashioned a pump to drain the cabin. Due to the boat damage and the local wind conditions, she determined that her original route to San Diego was no longer viable and decided instead to make the  journey to Hawaii.

Without a radio navigation system, Ashcraft was forced to navigate the yacht manually with the help of a sextant and a watch. She survived mainly on canned food during this time. On November 2241 days after the shipwreckAshcraft reached Hilo, Hawaii.

Bibliography
 2002: Red Sky in Mourning: A True Story of Love, Loss, and Survival at Sea by Tami Oldham Ashcraft and Susea McGearhart.

References

Female sailors
Living people
Maritime writers
Year of birth missing (living people)
21st-century American women writers
American women memoirists
21st-century American memoirists
Sole survivors
20th-century sailors